AEK Athens Football Club, also known simply as AEK, AEK Athens (in European competitions), or with its full name Athlitiki Enosis Konstantinoupoleos (Athletic Union of Constantinople), is a Greek association football club based in Nea Filadelfeia suburb of Athens.

The club has amassed various records since its founding. Regionally, domestically and continentally, the club has set several records in winning various official and unofficial competitions. Established in Athens in 1924 by Greek refugees from Constantinople in the wake of the Greco-Turkish War, A.E.K. is one of the most successful clubs in Greek football, winning 32 national titles (including 12 Championships, 15 Greek Cups, 1 League Cup and 3 Super Cups). The team has appeared several times in European (UEFA Champions League and UEFA Europa League) competitions. AEK is a member of the European Club Association.

The club was relegated from the Greek Super League after the 2012–13 season for the first time in its history. In an effort to discharge the immense debt created by years of mismanagement, its directors chose for the team to compete in the third tier Football League 2 for the 2013–14 season, thus turning the club into an amateur club. After 2 seasons on the lower tiers the club completed its comeback to the first division.

Honours

Domestic competitions
Leagues:
 Super League
Winners (12): 1938–39, 1939–40, 1962–63, 1967–68, 1970–71, 1977–78, 1978–79, 1988–89, 1991–92, 1992–93, 1993–94, 2017–18
Runners-up (19): 1945–46, 1957–58, 1958–59, 1959–60, 1964–65, 1966–67, 1969–70, 1974–75, 1975–76, 1980–81, 1987–88, 1987–88, 1995–96, 1996–97, 1998–99, 2001–02, 2005–06, 2006–07, 2016–17
Super League 2 (Second Division)
Winners (1): 2014–15
Gamma Ethniki (Third Division)
 Winners (1): 2013–14 (Group 6)

Cups:
Greek Cup
Winners (15): 1931–32, 1938–39, 1948–49, 1949–50, 1955–56, 1963–64, 1965–66, 1977–78, 1982–83, 1995–96, 1996–97, 1999–2000, 2001–02, 2010–11, 2015–16
Runners-up (11): 1947–48, 1952–53, 1978–79, 1993–94, 1994–95, 2005–06, 2001–02, 2015–16, 2017–18, 2018–19, 2019–20
Greek Super Cup
Winners (2): 1971 (Unofficial), 1989, 1996
Greek League Cup
Winners (1) (record): 1990

Doubles
Winners (2): 1938–39, 1977–78

European competitions

UEFA Cup
Semi-finals (1): 1976–77

European Cup
 Quarter-finals (1): 1968–69

UEFA Cup Winners' Cup
Quarter-finals (2): 1996–97, 1997–98

Balkans Cup
Runners-up (1): 1966–67

Regional
Athens FCA Championship
Winners (5): 1940, 1943, 1946, 1947, 1950
Pre-Mediterranean Cup
Winners (1) (record): 1991

Tournaments
Sydney Festival of Football
Winners (1) (record): 2010
Nova Supersports Cup
Winners (1) (joint record): 1999
Runners-up (2): 2000, 2001

Source: aekfc.gr

Player records

Players in bold are currently playing for AEK Athens. Players in italics are still active not playing for AEK Athens.

Most appearances

All competitions
{| class="wikitable sortable" style=text-align:center;
|-
!rowspan=2|
!rowspan=2 width=200|Name
!rowspan=2|
!rowspan=2|Years
!rowspan=2|League
!rowspan=2|AFCA
!rowspan=2|Cup
!rowspan=2|SuperCup
!rowspan=2|LeagueCup
!rowspan=2|Europe
!rowspan=2|BalkansCup
!rowspan=2|Total
|-
|1
|align=left|
|
|1978–1998
|447
|  0
| 96
|  4
|  4
| 42
|  0
|593
|-
|2
|align=left|
|
|1962–1980
|480
|  0
| 54
|  0
|  0
| 35
| 13
|582
|-
|3
|align=left|
|
|1951–1969
|314
|150
| 61
|  0
|  0
|  9
| 16
|551
|-
|4
|align=left|
|
|1988–2001
|357
|  0
| 85
|  2
|  3
| 48
|  0
|495
|-
|5
|align=left|
|
|1993–2004
|254
|  0
| 66
|  3
|  0
| 67
|  0
|390
|-
|6
|align=left|
|
|1992–2002
|251
|  0
| 70
|  1
|  0
| 51
|  0
|373
|-
|7
|align=left|
|
|1961–1972
|308
|  0
| 31
|  0
|  0
| 14
| 13
|366
|-
|8
|align=left|
|
|1971–1982
|295
|  0
| 36
|  0
|  0
| 30
|  0
|361
|-
|9
|align=left|
|
|1976–1987
|278
|  0
| 41
|  0
|  0
| 26
|  1
|345
|-
|10
|align=left|
|
|1953–1972
|243
| 40
| 37
|  0
|  0
|  4
| 16
|338
|-
|11
|align=left|
|
|1994–2005
|222
|  0
| 62
|  0
|  0
| 49
|  0
|334
|-
|12
|align=left|
|
|1972–1984
|264
|  0
| 33
|  0
|  0
| 24
|  1
|322
|-
|13
|align=left|
|
|1984–1993
|255
|  0
| 39
|  2
|  4
| 21
|  0
|321
|-
|14
|align=left|
|
|1974–1985
|261
|  0
| 41
|  0
|  0
| 13
|  0
|315
|-
|15
|align=left|
|
|2000–20122013–2015
|225
|  0
| 48
|  0
|  0
| 35
|  0
|308
|-
|16
|align=left|
|
|1993–19962000–2004
|195
|  0
| 55
|  2
|  0
| 49
|  0
|301
|-
|17
|align=left|
|
|1995–2004
|198
|  0
| 53
|  1
|  0
| 48
|  0
|300
|-
|18
|align=left|
|
|1981–1993
|231
|  0
| 46
|  1
|  5
| 11
|  0
|295
|-
|19
|align=left|
|
|2014–
|219
|  0
| 44
|  0
|  0
| 31
|  0
|294
|-
|20
|align=left|
|
|1990–2002
|193
|  0
| 73
|  2
|  0
| 22
|  0
|292
|-

International
{| class="wikitable sortable" style="text-align:center"
|-
!rowspan="2"|
!rowspan="2" width=200|Name
!colspan="4"|Apps
|-
!Total
!UCL
!CWC
!UEL
|-
|1
|align=left|
|67
|23
|16
|28
|-
|rowspan=2|3
|align=left|
|rowspan=2|51
|12
|16
|23
|-
|align=left|
|10
|11
|30
|-
|4
|align=left|
|50
|19
| 0
|31
|-
|rowspan=2|6
|align=left|
|rowspan=2|49
|26
| 4
|19
|-
|align=left|
|13
|13
|23
|-
|7
|align=left|
|48
|11
|14
|23
|-
|8
|align=left|
|47
|18
|15
|14
|-
|9
|align=left|
|40
|16
| 0
|24
|-
|10
|align=left|
|38
|14
|13
|11
|-
|11
|align=left|
|37
| 8
| 0
|29
|-
|12
|align=left|
|36
|15
| 0
|21
|-
|rowspan=2|14
|align=left|
|rowspan=2|35
|13
| 0
|22
|-
|align=left|
|10
|15
|10
|-
|15
|align=left|
|33
| 9
| 3
|21
|-
|rowspan=2|17
|align=left|
|rowspan=2|30
|10
| 0
|20
|-
|align=left|
| 8
| 0
|22
|-
|rowspan=4|21
|align=left|
|rowspan=4|29
|11
| 0
|18
|-
|align=left|
| 7
| 0
|22
|-
|align=left|
| 6
| 0
|23
|-
|align=left|
| 1
| 0
|28
|-
|rowspan=5|26
|align=left|
|rowspan=5|26
|16
| 0
|10
|-
|align=left|
|14
| 0
|12
|-
|align=left|
|12
| 0
|14
|-
|align=left|
|10
| 0
|16
|-
|align=left|
| 7
| 0
|19
|-
|27
|align=left|
|25
| 6
| 2
|17
|-
|rowspan=2|29
|align=left|
|rowspan=2|24
|12
|10
| 2
|-
|align=left|
| 0
| 0
|24
|-
|rowspan=2|31
|align=left|
|rowspan=2|23
|13
| 0
|10
|-
|align=left|
| 6
| 1
|16
|-
|rowspan=4|35
|align=left|
|rowspan=4|22
|11
| 0
|11
|-
|align=left|
|10
|12
| 0
|-
|align=left|
|10
| 3
| 9
|-
|align=left|
| 5
| 0
|17
|-
|rowspan=4|39
|align=left|
|rowspan=4|21
| 8
| 2
|11
|-
|align=left|
| 6
| 0
|15
|-
|align=left|
| 5
| 0
|16
|-
|align=left|
| 0
| 0
|21
|-
|rowspan=4|43
|align=left|
|rowspan=4|20
|11
| 3
| 6
|-
|align=left|
| 7
| 0
|13
|-
|align=left|
| 4
| 0
|16
|-
|align=left|
| 4
| 0
|16
|-

Youngest players
This is a list of the youngest players that have debuted for AEK Athens in official competitions.
{| class="wikitable sortable" style=text-align:center;
|-
!
!width=200|Name
!
!Date
!width=100|Opponent
!Venue
!Competition
!Fixture
!Age at the time
|-
|1
|align=left|
|
|17/03/2012
|align=left|Asteras Tripolis
|Away
|Super League
|25
|align=left|
|-
|2
|align=left|
|
|21/05/2014
|align=left|Pannaxiakos
|Home
|Football League 2
|30
|align=left|
|-
|3
|align=left|
|
|01/11/2007
|align=left|Fostiras
|Away
|Greek Cup
|R4
|align=left|
|-
|4
|align=left|
|
|21/05/2014
|align=left|Pannaxiakos
|Home
|Football League 2
|30
|align=left|
|-
|5
|align=left|
|
|21/05/2014
|align=left|Pannaxiakos
|Home
|Football League 2
|30
|align=left|
|-
|6
|align=left|
|
|12/03/1961
|align=left|Aris
|Away
|Alpha Ethniki
|21
|align=left|
|-
|7
|align=left|
|
|18/10/2020
|align=left|PAOK
|Home
|Super League
|5
|align=left|
|-
|8
|align=left|
|
|13/05/2007
|align=left|Panionios
|Away
|Super League
|30
|align=left|
|-
|9
|align=left|
|
|04/11/2010
|align=left|Anderlecht
|Home
|Europa League
|4
|align=left|
|-
|10
|align=left|
|
|28/08/2005
|align=left|Atromitos
|Away
|Alpha Ethniki
|1
|align=left|
|-

Oldest players
This is a list of the oldest players that have played for AEK Athens in official competitions.

Top scorers

All competitions
{| class="wikitable sortable" style=text-align:center;
|-
!rowspan=2|
!rowspan=2 width=200|Name
!rowspan=2|
!rowspan=2|Years
!rowspan=2|League
!rowspan=2|AFCA
!rowspan=2|Cup
!rowspan=2|SuperCup
!rowspan=2|LeagueCup
!rowspan=2|Europe
!rowspan=2|BalkansCup
!rowspan=2|Total
|-
|1
|align=left|
|
|1962–1980
|234
|  0
| 45
|  0
|  0
| 11
|  9
|299
|-
|2
|align=left|
|
|1955–1965
|172
| 13
| 36
|  0
|  0
|  2
|  4
|227
|-
|3
|align=left|
|
|1976–1987
|174
|  0
| 41
|  0
|  0
|  6
|  3
|224
|-
|4
|align=left|
|
|1996–2003
|125
|  0
| 25
|  0
|  0
| 26
|  0
|176
|-
|5
|align=left|
|
|1951–1969
| 75
| 64
| 32
|  0
|  0
|  1
|  1
|169
|-
|6
|align=left|
|
|1965–1974
| 94
|  0
| 23
|  0
|  0
|  3
|  1
|121
|-
|7
|align=left|
|
|1993–19962000–2004
| 80
|  0
| 26
|  0
|  0
| 10
|  0
|116
|-
|8
|align=left|
|
|1991–1996
| 81
|  0
| 26
|  0
|  0
|  4
|  0
|111
|-
|9
|align=left|
|
|2003–20082010-2012
| 84
|  0
| 11
|  0
|  0
|  6
|  0
|101
|-
|10
|align=left|
|
|1989–19921995–1999
| 67
|  0
| 16
|  0
|  2
|  8
|  0
|93
|-
|11
|align=left|
|
|1977–1981
| 65
|  0
| 23
|  0
|  0
|  3
|  0
|91
|-
|12
|align=left|
|
|1934–1952
|  9
| 54
| 26
|  0
|  0
|  0
|  0
|89
|-
|13
|align=left|
|
|1994–19982000–2005
| 56
|  0
| 13
|  0
|  0
|  3
|  0
|72
|-
|14
|align=left|
|
|2007–2011
| 55
|  0
|  9
|  0
|  0
|  8
|  0
|72
|-
|15
|align=left|
|
|1949–1960
| 16
| 38+
| 13
|  0
|  0
|  0
|  0
|67+
|-
|16
|align=left|
|
|1991–1994
| 49
|  0
| 17
|  0
|  0
|  1
|  0
|67
|-
|17
|align=left|
|
|1988–2001
| 51
|  0
| 10
|  0
|  0
|  6
|  0
|67
|-
|18
|align=left|
|
|1964–1969
| 53
|  0
| 11
|  0
|  0
|  1
|  1
|66
|-
|19
|align=left|
|
|1998–20042005–2007
| 42
|  0
| 14
|  0
|  0
|  8
|  0
|65
|-
|20
|align=left|
|
|1995–2004
| 42
|  0
| 17
|  0
|  0
|  5
|  0
|64
|-

League top scorers

A record of 14 different AEK players have finished the season as the top scorer in the Greek championship.

International

{| class="wikitable sortable" style="text-align:center"
|-
!rowspan="2"|
!rowspan="2" width=200|Name
!colspan="5"|Goals
|-
!Total
!UCL
!CWC
!UEL
!UECL
|-
| 1
|align=left|
|26
| 2
| 3
|21
| 0
|-
| 2
|align=left|
|11
| 4
| 2
| 5
| 0
|-
| 3
|align=left|
|10
| 2
| 0
| 8
| 0
|-
|rowspan=4| 7
|align=left|
|rowspan=4| 8
| 2
| 0
| 6
| 0
|-
|align=left|
| 1
| 0
| 7
| 0
|-
|align=left|
| 0
| 5
| 3
| 0
|-
|align=left|
| 0
| 0
| 8
| 0
|-
| 8
|align=left|
| 7
| 1
| 0
| 5
| 1
|-
|rowspan=5| 13
|align=left|
|rowspan=5| 6
| 5
| 1
| 0
| 0
|-
|align=left|
| 3
| 0
| 3
| 0
|-
|align=left|
| 2
| 0
| 4
| 0
|-
|align=left|
| 2
| 0
| 4
| 0
|-
|align=left|
| 0
| 3
| 3
| 0
|-
|rowspan=5| 18
|align=left|
|rowspan=5| 5
| 4
| 0
| 1
| 0
|-
|align=left|
| 1
| 2
| 2
| 0
|-
|align=left|
| 0
| 0
| 5
| 0
|-
|align=left|
| 0
| 0
| 5
| 0
|-
|align=left|
| 0
| 0
| 5
| 0
|-
|rowspan=4| 22
|align=left|
|rowspan=4| 4
| 4
| 0
| 0
| 0
|-
|align=left|
| 2
| 0
| 2
| 0
|-
|align=left|
| 2
| 0
| 2
| 0
|-
|align=left|
| 0
| 0
| 4
| 0
|-
|rowspan=14| 36
|align=left|
|rowspan=14| 3
| 3
| 0
| 0
| 0
|-
|align=left|
| 3
| 0
| 0
| 0
|-
|align=left|
| 2
| 1
| 0
| 0
|-
|align=left|
| 1
| 2
| 0
| 0
|-
|align=left|
| 1
| 0
| 2
| 0
|-
|align=left|
| 1
| 0
| 2
| 0
|-
|align=left|
| 1
| 0
| 2
| 0
|-
|align=left|
| 0
| 3
| 0
| 0
|-
|align=left|
| 0
| 0
| 3
| 0
|-
|align=left|
| 0
| 0
| 3
| 0
|-
|align=left|
| 0
| 0
| 3
| 0
|-
|align=left|
| 0
| 0
| 3
| 0
|-
|align=left|
| 0
| 0
| 3
| 0
|-
|align=left|
| 0
| 0
| 3
| 0
|-
| rowspan=18| 54
|align=left|
| rowspan=18| 2
| 2
| 0
| 0
| 0
|-
|align=left|
| 2
| 0
| 0
| 0
|-
|align=left|
| 2
| 0
| 0
| 0
|-
|align=left|
| 1
| 1
| 0
| 0
|-
|align=left|
| 1
| 0
| 1
| 0
|-
|align=left|
| 1
| 0
| 1
| 0
|-
|align=left|
| 0
| 2
| 0
| 0
|-
|align=left|
| 0
| 2
| 0
| 0
|-
|align=left|
| 0
| 0
| 2
| 0
|-
|align=left|
| 0
| 0
| 2
| 0
|-
|align=left|
| 0
| 0
| 2
| 0
|-
|align=left|
| 0
| 0
| 2
| 0
|-
|align=left|
| 0
| 0
| 2
| 0
|-
|align=left|
| 0
| 0
| 2
| 0
|-
|align=left|
| 0
| 0
| 2
| 0
|-
|align=left|
| 0
| 0
| 2
| 0
|-
|align=left|
| 0
| 0
| 2
| 0
|-
|align=left|
| 0
| 0
| 1
| 1
|-
| rowspan=48| 101
|align=left|
| rowspan=48| 1
| 1
| 0
| 0
| 0
|-
|align=left|
| 1
| 0 
| 0
| 0
|-
|align=left|
| 1
| 0
| 0
| 0
|-
|align=left|
| 1
| 0
| 0
| 0
|-
|align=left|
| 1
| 0
| 0
| 0
|-
|align=left|
| 1
| 0
| 0
| 0
|-
|align=left|
| 1
| 0
| 0
| 0
|-
|align=left|
| 1
| 0
| 0
| 0
|-
|align=left|
| 1
| 0
| 0
| 0
|-
|align=left|
| 1
| 0
| 0
| 0
|-
|align=left|
| 1
| 0
| 0
| 0
|-
|align=left|
| 1
| 0
| 0
| 0
|-
|align=left|
| 1
| 0
| 0
| 0
|-
|align=left|
| 1
| 0
| 0
| 0
|-
|align=left|
| 1
| 0
| 0
| 0
|-
|align=left|
| 0
| 1
| 0
| 0
|-
|align=left|
| 0
| 1
| 0
| 0
|-
|align=left|
| 0
| 1
| 0
| 0
|-
|align=left|
| 0
| 1
| 0
| 0
|-
|align=left|
| 0
| 1
| 0
| 0
|-
|align=left|
| 0
| 0
| 1
| 0
|-
|align=left|
| 0
| 0
| 1
| 0
|-
|align=left|
| 0
| 0
| 1
| 0
|-
|align=left|
| 0
| 0
| 1
| 0
|-
|align=left|
| 0
| 0
| 1
| 0
|-
|align=left|
| 0
| 0
| 1
| 0
|-
|align=left|
| 0
| 0
| 1
| 0
|-
|align=left|
| 0
| 0
| 1
| 0
|-
|align=left|
| 0
| 0
| 1
| 0
|-
|align=left|
| 0
| 0
| 1
| 0
|-
|align=left|
| 0
| 0
| 1
| 0
|-
|align=left|
| 0
| 0
| 1
| 0
|-
|align=left|
| 0
| 0
| 1
| 0
|-
|align=left|
| 0
| 0
| 1
| 0
|-
|align=left|
| 0
| 0
| 1
| 0
|-
|align=left|
| 0
| 0
| 1
| 0
|-
|align=left|
| 0
| 0
| 1
| 0
|-
|align=left|
| 0
| 0
| 1
| 0
|-
|align=left|
| 0
| 0
| 1
| 0
|-
|align=left|
| 0
| 0
| 1
| 0
|-
|align=left|
| 0
| 0
| 1
| 0
|-
|align=left|
| 0
| 0
| 1
| 0
|-
|align=left|
| 0
| 0
| 1
| 0
|-
|align=left|
| 0
| 0
| 1
| 0
|-
|align=left|
| 0
| 0
| 1
| 0
|-
|align=left|
| 0
| 0
| 1
| 0
|-
|align=left|
| 0
| 0
| 1
| 0
|-
|align=left|
| 0
| 0
| 1
| 0
|-
| colspan=2|
| 9
| 4
| 1
| 4
| 0
|-
!  colspan=2|Total
!291
! 77
! 33
!179
! 2
|-

Youngest goalscorers
This list includes the youngest players that have scored for AEK Athens in official competitions.

Oldest goalscorers
This list includes the oldest players that have scored for AEK Athens in official competitions.

Top scorers by season

This is a list of the top scorers of AEK Athens for each season. (Competitive matches only.)

Managerial Records

Honours

Matches

Competitive, official competitions only. Wins, appear in parentheses.

Awards

Player Awards

Super League
Best Greek Player Award
 Stelios Manolas: (1) 1992–93
 Alexis Alexandris: (1) 1993–94
 Michalis Kasapis: (1) 1994–95
 Vasilios Tsiartas: (1) 1995–96
 Christos Kostis: (1) 1996–97
 Demis Nikolaidis: (3) 1996–97, 1997–98, 2001–02
 Kostas Katsouranis: (1) 2004–05
 Nikos Liberopoulos: (2) 2005–06, 2006–07
 Petros Mantalos: (1) 2016–17
 Lazaros Christodoulopoulos: (1) 2017–18

Best Foreign Player Award
 Temur Ketsbaia: (1) 1995–96
 Ismael Blanco: (1) 2007–08

Best Young Player Award
 Michalis Kasapis: (1) 1993–94
 Sokratis Papastathopoulos: (1) 2007–08

Best Goalkeeper Award
 Ilias Atmatsidis: (2) 1997–98, 1998–99

Football league
Best Player Award
 Christos Aravidis: (1) 2014–15

Best Foreign Player Award
 Jakob Johansson: (1) 2014–15

Best Young Player Award
 Adam Tzanetopoulos: (1) 2014–15

Coach awards

Super League
Best coach Award
 Dušan Bajević: (4) 1992–93, 1993–94, 1995–96, 2002–03
 Fernando Santos: (2) 2001–02, 2004–05
 Manolo Jiménez: (1) 2017–18

Football League
Best coach Award
 Traianos Dellas: (1) 2014–15

Team records

Greece

Most goals scored in a season: 
123 goals scored in the 1978–79 season: 90 for the League, 24 for the Cup and 9 for the European Cup.

Most goals scored by a footballer in a single match (league games only): 5
 Kostas Nestoridis, against Iraklis on 3 June 1963 (5–0).
 Thomas Mavros, against Egaleo on 27 January 1985 (5–2).
 Demis Nikolaidis, against Kalamata on 23 February 1997 (6–1).

Most goals scored by a footballer in a single match (cup games only): 7
 Andreas Papaemmanouil, against Kipoupoli on 13 September 1970 (20–0).

Longest consecutive unbeaten matches in Super League:
25 games (23 October 2017 to 23 September 2018)

Longest consecutive unbeaten matches in all competitions:
26 games (23 October 2017 to 1 March 2018)

Least league goals concieded in a season:
12 goals, in 2017–18 season (30 games) (domestic record)

Consecutive league titles:
Won 3 championship titles: 1991–92, 1992–93, 1993–94 seasons.

Consecutive knock-out qualifications in Greek Cup:
15 qualifications: 2015–16, 2016–17, 2017–18, 2018–19, 2019–20 seasons. (5 consecutive presences in the Cup Final)  (domestic record)

Europe

Consecutive draws in the group stage of the UEFA Champions League:
6 draws in 2002–03 season. (european record)

Participation in the quarter-final round European competitions at least once.
3 European competitions' quarter finals: (domestic record)
European Cup in 1968–69 season.
UEFA Cup in 1976–77 season.
UEFA Cup Winners' Cup in 1996–97 and 1997–98 season.

Best European Cup/UEFA Champions League season:
Quarter-finals in 1968–69 season.

Best UEFA Cup/UEFA Europa League season:
Semi-finals in 1976–77 season. (domestic record)

Best UEFA Cup Winners' Cup season:
Quarter-finals in 1996–97 and 1997–98 season.

Best Balkans Cup season:
Runners-up in 1966–67 season.

Longest consecutive unbeaten matches in the group stage of the UEFA Champions League:
6 games in 2002–03 season. (domestic record)

Longest consecutive unbeaten matches in the group stage of the UEFA Europa League:
6 games in 2017–18 season. (domestic record)

Consecutive participations in the quarter-final of European competitions:
2 consecutive quarter−finals: UEFA Cup Winners' Cup in 1996–97 and 1997–98 season. (domestic record)

Consecutive participations in the round of 16 of European competitions:
4 consecutive seasons: (domestic record)
1994–95 season in the UEFA Champions League.
1995–96, 1996–97 and 1997–98 season in the UEFA Cup Winners' Cup.

Consecutive participations in the round of 16 of the UEFA Cup Winners' Cup:
3 consecutive seasons: 1995–96, 1996–97 and 1997–98 season. (domestic record)

Consecutive participations in the round of 16 of the UEFA Cup:
3 consecutive seasons: 2000–01, 2001–02 and 2002–03 season. (domestic record)

European unbeaten seasons in the group stage:
2 seasons: (domestic record)
 UEFA Champions League in 2002–03 season.
 UEFA Europa League in 2017–18 season.

First Greek club to participate in the UEFA Champions League.
AEK Athens participated in the UEFA Champions League in 1992–93 season.

First Greek club to participate in the group stage of the UEFA Champions League.
AEK Athens participated in the group stage of the UEFA Champions League in 1994–95 season.

First Greek club that reached the Quarter-finals of the European Cup.
AEK Athens reached the Quarter-finals of the European Cup in 1968–69 season.

European competition runs

Consecutive European games won:
4 games in the knock-out stages of the Cup Winners' Cup in 1996–97 season.

Consecutive European games drawn:
8 games: From the group stage and in the round of 32 of the UEFA Europa League in 2017–18 season to the 3rd qualifying round of the UEFA Champions League in 2018–19 season. (domestic record)

Consecutive European games lost:
6 games in the group stage of the UEFA Champions League in  2018–19 season. (domestic record)

Consecutive European games without a win:
7 games: From the group stage of the UEFA Champions League in 2003–04 season to the first round of the UEFA Cup in  2004–05 season. (3 draws and 4 defeats from 17 September 2003 to 30 September 2004)

Consecutive European games without a draw:
20 games: From the second round of the UEFA Cup in the 1977–78 season to the second round of the European Cup in the 1989–90 season. (6 wins and 14 losses from 2 November 1977 to 1 November 1989.)

Consecutive European games without a loss:
14 games: From the UEFA Europa League in 2017–18 season to the qualification rounds for the UEFA Champions League in 2018–19 season. (4 wins and 10 draws from 17 August 2017 to 19 September 2018) (domestic record)

Consecutive European home games won:
6 games from the first round of the UEFA Cup in the 1975–76 season to the quarter–finals of the UEFA Cup in the 1976–77 season.

Consecutive European home games drawn:
4 games in the UEFA Europa League in 2017–18 season.

Consecutive European home games lost:
5 games: From the group stage of the UEFA Europa League in the 2011–12 season to the third qualifying round for the UEFA Champions League in the 2017–18 season.

Consecutive European home games without a win:
6 games in the UEFA Champions League in 2018–19 season.

Consecutive European home games without a draw:
13 games: From the first round of the Inter-Cities Fairs Cup in the 1970–71 season to the first round of the UEFA Cup in the 1977–78 season. (10 wins and 3 losses from 2 September 1970 to 19 October 1977.)

Consecutive European home games without a loss: 
12 games: From the first round of the UEFA Cup Winners' Cup in the 1997–98 season to the third round of the UEFA Cup in the 2000–01 season. (8 wins and 4 draws from 18 September 1997 to 15 February 2001.)

Consecutive European away games won:
2 games in the UEFA Cup Winners' Cup in the 1996–97 season and in the qualification rounds of the UEFA Europa League in the 2019–20 season.

Consecutive European away games drawn:
3 games in the UEFA Champions League in the 2002–03 season and in the UEFA Europa League in the 2017–18 season.

Consecutive European away games lost:
15 games: From the third round of the UEFA Cup in the 1976–77 season to the second round of the European Cup in the 1989–90 season. (from 2 November 1977 to 18 September 1991.)

Consecutive European away games without a win:
15 games: From the third round of the UEFA Cup in the 1976–77 season to the second round of the European Cup in the 1989–90 season. (from 2 November 1977 to 18 September 1991.)

Consecutive European away games without a draw:
19 games: From the second round of the UEFA Cup in the 1975–76 season to the first round of the UEFA Cup in the 1990–91 season. (2 wins and 17 losses from 22 October 1975 to 23 October 1991.)

Consecutive European away games without a loss:
7 games: From the play-off round of the UEFA Europa League in 2017–18 season to the play-off round for the UEFA Champions League in 2018–19 season. (4 wins and 3 draws from 17 August 2017 to 19 September 2018)

Consecutive European games in which AEK scored:
12 games

Consecutive European games in which AEK conceded:
8 games

Consecutive European games without scoring:
5 games: From the 3rd qualifying round of the UEFA Europa League in 2016–17 season to the play-off round for the UEFA Europa League in 2017–18 season. (28 July 2016 – 24 August 2017)

Consecutive European games without conceding:
3 games

Record wins

League

Cup

Unofficial

Notes

 a.  AFCA league.
 b.  2nd division.
 c.  3rd division.

Attendance records

The attendance record in AEK Athens' original homeground, Nikos Goumas Stadium is 36,766 spectators. It occurred on 30 November 1980 in a league game against Panathinaikos which resulted in a 0–0 draw.

International record

Best seasons

Notes

 a.  Internazionale were the eventual runners-up.
 b.  Milan were the eventual winners.
 c.  Real Madrid were the defending champions and again the eventual winners.

Record by country of opposition

{|class="wikitable sortable" style="text-align:center" 
! rowspan=2| Country
! colspan=7| Home
! colspan=7| Away
! colspan=8| Total
|-
! Pld
! W
! D
! L
! GF
! GA
! GD
! Pld
! W
! D
! L
! GF
! GA
! GD
! Pld
! W
! D
! L
! GF
! GA
! GD
! Win%
|-
|-bgcolor="#CCFFCC"
| align=left| 
| 3
| 2
| 0
| 1
| 5
| 5
| 0
| 3
| 1
| 0
| 2
| 2
| 5
| -3
| 6
| 3
| 0
| 3
| 7
| 10
| -3
| 
|-
|-bgcolor="#FFBBBB"
| align=left| 
| 5
| 2
| 1
| 2
| 9
| 7
| +2
| 5
| 1
| 2
| 2
| 3
| 3
| 0
| 10 
| 3
| 3
| 4
| 12
| 10
| +2
| 
|-
|-bgcolor="#FFBBBB"
| align=left| 
| 6
| 1
| 4
| 1
| 9
| 7
| +2
| 6
| 0
| 3
| 3
| 4
| 13
| -9
| 12
| 1
| 7
| 4
| 13
| 20
| -7
| 
|-
|-bgcolor="#FFBBBB"
| align=left| 
| 1
| 0
| 1
| 0
| 2
| 2
| 0
| 1
| 0
| 0
| 1
| 1
| 2
| -1
| 2
| 0
| 1
| 1
| 3
| 4
| -1
| 
|-
|-bgcolor="#CCFFCC"
| align=left| 
| 2
| 2
| 0
| 0
| 4
| 1
| +3
| 2
| 0
| 0
| 2
| 1
| 4
| -3
| 4
| 2
| 0
| 2
| 5
| 5
| 0
| 
|-
|-bgcolor="#FFBBBB"
| align=left| 
| 4
| 3
| 0
| 1
| 7
| 6
| +1
| 4
| 0
| 2
| 2
| 5
| 9
| -4
| 8
| 3
| 2
| 3
| 12
| 15
| -3
| 
|-
|-bgcolor="#CCFFCC"
| align=left| 
| 4
| 3
| 1
| 0
| 9
| 4
| +5
| 4
| 3
| 0
| 1
| 8
| 7
| +1
| 8
| 6
| 1
| 1
| 17
| 11
| +6
| 
|-
|-bgcolor="#FFBBBB"
| align=left| 
| 3
| 1
| 1
| 1
| 2
| 2
| 0
| 3
| 1
| 2
| 0
| 7
| 6
| +1
| 6
| 2
| 3
| 1
| 9
| 8
| +1
| 
|-
|-bgcolor="#CCFFCC"
| align=left| 
| 0
| 0
| 0
| 0
| 0
| 0
| 0
| 1
| 1
| 0
| 0
| 1
| 0
| +1
| 1
| 1
| 0
| 0
| 1
| 0
| +1
| 
|-
|-bgcolor="#CCFFCC"
| align=left| 
| 2
| 1
| 1
| 0
| 5
| 0
| +5
| 2
| 1
| 0
| 1
| 3
| 2
| +1
| 4
| 2
| 1
| 1
| 8
| 2
| +6
| 
|-
|-bgcolor="#FFBBBB"
| align=left| 
| 6
| 2
| 0
| 4
| 8
| 8
| 0
| 6
| 1
| 0
| 5
| 4
| 19
| -15
| 12
| 3
| 0
| 9
| 12
| 27
| -15
| 
|-
|-bgcolor="#FFBBBB"
| align=left| 
| 10
| 1
| 5
| 4
| 7
| 13
| -6
| 9
| 0
| 2
| 7
| 3
| 20
| -17
| 19
| 1
| 7
| 11
| 10
| 33
| -23
| 
|-
|-bgcolor="#CCFFCC"
| align=left| 
| 2
| 2
| 0
| 0
| 7
| 1
| +6
| 2
| 1
| 1
| 0
| 2
| 1
| +1
| 4
| 3
| 1
| 0
| 9
| 2
| +8
| 
|-
|-bgcolor="#FFBBBB"
| align=left| 
| 7
| 3
| 0
| 4
| 9
| 10
| -1
| 5
| 0
| 1
| 4
| 5
| 16
| -11
| 12
| 3
| 1
| 8
| 14
| 26
| -12
| 
|-
|-bgcolor="#CCFFCC"
| align=left| 
| 6
| 5
| 1
| 0
| 13
| 2
| +11
| 6
| 1
| 2
| 3
| 9
| 14
| -5
| 12
| 6
| 3
| 3
| 22
| 16
| +6
| 
|-
|-bgcolor="#CCFFCC"
| align=left| 
| 1
| 1
| 0
| 0
| 4
| 0
| +4
| 1
| 1
| 0
| 0
| 4
| 1
| +3
| 2
| 2
| 0
| 0
| 8
| 1
| +7
| 
|-
|-bgcolor="#FFBBBB"
| align=left| 
| 10
| 2
| 6
| 2
| 9
| 9
| 0
| 9
| 0
| 2
| 7
| 5
| 20
| -15
| 19
| 2
| 8
| 9
| 14
| 29
| -15
| 
|-
|-bgcolor="#CCFFCC"
| align=left| 
| 1
| 1
| 0
| 0
| 5
| 0
| +5
| 1
| 1
| 0
| 0
| 4
| 2
| +2
| 2
| 2
| 0
| 0
| 9
| 2
| +7
| 
|-
|-bgcolor="#CCFFCC"
| align=left| 
| 2
| 2
| 0
| 0
| 9
| 0
| +9
| 2
| 1
| 0
| 1
| 4
| 3
| +1
| 4
| 3
| 0
| 1
| 13
| 3
| +10
| 
|-
|-bgcolor="#CCFFCC"
| align=left| 
| 1
| 1
| 0
| 0
| 1
| 0
| +1
| 1
| 0
| 1
| 0
| 1
| 1
| 0
| 2
| 1
| 1
| 0
| 2
| 1
| +1
| 
|-
|-bgcolor="#FFBBBB"
| align=left| 
| 6
| 1
| 1
| 4
| 5
| 9
| -4
| 6
| 0
| 0
| 6
| 0
| 16
| -16
| 12
| 1
| 1
| 10
| 5
| 25
| -20
| 
|-
|-bgcolor="#FFBBBB"
| align=left| 
| 5
| 2
| 0
| 3
| 11
| 9
| +2
| 5
| 0
| 0
| 5
| 4
| 13
| -9
| 10
| 2
| 0
| 8
| 15
| 22
| -7
| 
|-
|-bgcolor="#FFBBBB"
| align=left| 
| 5
| 4
| 1
| 1
| 14
| 5
| +9
| 6
| 1
| 1
| 4
| 4
| 10
| -6
| 12
| 5
| 2
| 5
| 18
| 15
| +3
| 
|-
|-bgcolor="#FFBBBB"
| align=left| 
| 7
| 2
| 1
| 4
| 5
| 10
| -5
| 8
| 0
| 2
| 6
| 6
| 17
| -11
| 15
| 2
| 3
| 10
| 11
| 27
| -16
| 
|-
|-bgcolor="#CCFFCC"
| align=left| 
| 5
| 4
| 1
| 0
| 10
| 2
| +8
| 5
| 3
| 1
| 1
| 7
| 5
| +2
| 10
| 7
| 2
| 1
| 17
| 7
| +10
| 
|-
|-bgcolor="#CCFFCC"
| align=left| 
| 2
| 2
| 0
| 0
| 5
| 1
| +4
| 2
| 0
| 1
| 1
| 1
| 3
| -2
| 4
| 2
| 1
| 1
| 6
| 4
| +2
| 
|-
|-bgcolor="#CCFFCC"
| align=left| 
| 3
| 2
| 1
| 0
| 5
| 2
| +3
| 3
| 1
| 0
| 2
| 3
| 5
| -2
| 6
| 3
| 1
| 2
| 8
| 7
| +1
| 
|-
|-bgcolor="#CCFFCC"
| align=left| 
| 3
| 2
| 1
| 0
| 5
| 0
| +5
| 3
| 1
| 2
| 0
| 6
| 4
| +2
| 6
| 3
| 3
| 0
| 11
| 4
| +7
| 
|-
|-bgcolor="#FFBBBB"
| align=left| 
| 9
| 2
| 3
| 4
| 9
| 13
| -4
| 9
| 0
| 2
| 7
| 4
| 25
| -21
| 18
| 2
| 5
| 11
| 13
| 38
| -25
| 
|-
|-bgcolor="#FFBBBB"
| align=left| 
| 1
| 0
| 1
| 0
| 0
| 0
| 0
| 2
| 0
| 1
| 1
| 1
| 2
| -1
| 3
| 0
| 2
| 1
| 1
| 2
| -1
| 
|-
|-bgcolor="#CCFFCC"
| align=left| 
| 2
| 2
| 0
| 0
| 5
| 1
| +4
| 3
| 1
| 1
| 1
| 3
| 3
| 0
| 5
| 3
| 1
| 1
| 8
| 4
| +4
| 
|-
|-bgcolor="#FFBBBB"
| align=left| 
| 4
| 2
| 1
| 1
| 8
| 7
| +1
| 5
| 1
| 0
| 4
| 4
| 12
| -8
| 9
| 3
| 1
| 5
| 12
| 19
| -7
| 
|-
|-bgcolor="#FFBBBB"
| align=left| 
| 2
| 0
| 1
| 1
| 1
| 4
| -3
| 2
| 1
| 1
| 0
| 4
| 1
| +3
| 4
| 1
| 2
| 1
| 5
| 5
| 0
| 
|-class="sortbottom"
! align=left| 
!131
!60
!33
!38
!207
!140
!+67
!132
!23
!30
!79
!123
!264
!-141
!263
!83
!63
!117
!330
!404
!-74
!

 1970–71 Inter-Cities Fairs Cup matches against Twente are included.
 1960–61, 1966–67, 1967–68 and 1980–81 Balkans Cup matches are included.
 Last entry was 2021–22 Europa Conference League second qualifying round second match against Velež Mostar.
 The record after last entry is 263 matches in total (83W, 63D, 117L, GF330, GA404), with 131 home matches (60W, 33D, 38L, GF207, GA140) and 132 away matches (23W, 30D, 79L, GF123, GA264).

Transfer records
Players in bold are currently playing for AEK Athens. Players in italics are still active not playing for AEK Athens.

Transfer fee paid

Transfer fee received

 a.  Beitar Jerusalem maintained a 40% of the player's rights.
 b.  plus €1,000,000 bonuses.
 c.  plus 15% (€675,000 from transfer to Milan) of resale fee.
 d.  plus €300,000 bonuses.
 e.  plus Krisztián Németh on one-year free loan. (Sotirios Kyrgiakos)
 f.  plus resale fee (Mario Mitaj)
 g.  plus 25% (€900,000 from transfer to Panathinaikos) of resale fee and the incomes from their scheduled friendly game (€294,390).

See also
 AEK Athens F.C.
 AEK Athens F.C. in European football
 History of AEK Athens F.C.

References

External links

Official websites
Official website 
AEK Athens at Super League Greece 
AEK Athens at UEFA
AEK Athens at FIFA
News sites
AEK Athens on aek365.org 
AEK Athens news from Nova Sports

Media
AEK Athens on Facebook
AEK Athens on YouTube
Other
AEK Athens e-shop

 
Football